Backwaxed is a compilation album by the Canadian heavy metal band Anvil. It is a compilation which features five unreleased tracks recorded during sessions for previous albums on side one, and five previously released tracks on side two. It is Anvil's only album with a main title not consisting of three words with the first and third words starting with the same letter.

Track listing

Personnel
Anvil
Steve "Lips" Kudlow – vocals, guitar
Dave Allison – guitar, vocals on "You're a Liar"
Ian Dickson – bass guitar
Robb Reiner – drums

Production
Chris Tsangarides – producer, engineer and mixing on tracks 2, 6–9
Anvil – producer on tracks 1, 3–5, 10
Ralph Alonso – compiler

References

Anvil (band) albums
1983 compilation albums
Attic Records albums
Albums produced by Chris Tsangarides